The Sports Parade (a.k.a. “The Sport Parade”) was a short film series of Warner Bros. that was regularly shown before the main studio feature, along with another Warner-Vitaphone short, Joe McDoakes comedy and/or Looney Tunes  and Merrie Melodies cartoons. The average running time of each film was between nine and eleven minutes.

Overview

Virtually all of these were filmed in Technicolor. (A few early ones used Cinecolor as it gradually replaced the Vitaphone Color Parade on Warner’s short subject program.) This gave them an advantage over rival series like Paramount Sportlights with Grantland Rice, Columbia World of Sports, RKO Pathé Sportscopes, Universal Variety Views, and MGM Pete Smith “Football Thrills”, which used color sparingly for special entries. Warner’s most prolific competitor in Technicolor live-action shorts, 20th Century-Fox, produced only 20 out of 100+ Movietone Sports Reviews from the late thirties through early fifties in color. In the era before television, it was considered more economical to shoot in black and white like the newsreels.

Although Warner Bros. separated this series from its less sports-oriented series Technicolor Adventure (film series) during the later 1940s, many post-war Sports Parades resembled high quality color travelogues of the period, showcasing a variety of recreational pursuits in the Caribbean, South America, Europe, Egypt, India and Australia. André de la Varre supervised many of the best international productions, while Edwin E. Olsen and ski expert Dick Durrance were particularly skilled at using hand-held cameras for up-front action shots. Howard Hill specialized in archery and Van Campen Heilner handled many fishing and camping reels for both Warner and studio rival RKO. Despite lacking high profile sports news commentators, key radio veterans like Art Gilmore and Marvin Miller put a lot of energy and enthusiasm into their narration.

The series won three Academy Awards and was nominated three other times. Despite being phased out in 1956, they were successfully reissued throughout the sixties since many of the topics had a timeless appeal and were always popular at the box office.

List of titles

Below is a listing of titles by year of release, listed by title / major credits / release date / notes of interest. Only a few have made DVD release.

1940

1941

1942

1943

1944

1945

1946

1947

1948

1949

1950

1951

1952

1953

1954

1955

1956

See also
List of short subjects by Hollywood studio#Warner Brothers
Travelogue (films)

References
 Liebman, Roy Vitaphone Films – A Catalogue of the Features and Shorts 2003 McFarland & Company
 Motion Pictures 1912-1939 Catalog of Copyright Entries 1951 Library of Congress
 Motion Pictures 1940-1949 Catalog of Copyright Entries 1953 Library of Congress
 Motion Pictures 1950-1959 Catalog of Copyright Entries 1960 Library of Congress
BoxOffice back issue scans

Warner Bros. short films
Documentary film series